Iwakura may refer to:

Iwakura rock sects, sacred rocks considered to be abodes of the gods in Shinto
Iwakura, Aichi, a city in Aichi Prefecture of Japan
Iwakura Mission, a diplomatic program during the Meiji restoration
Iwakura Oda, alternate Japanese Oda clan of Owari Province

As a surname
Iwakura Tomomi (1825–1883), a statesman during the Meiji restoration
Iwakura Lain, the title character of the anime television series Serial Experiments Lain

See also
Iwakura Station (disambiguation)